Mary Beecher Longyear (December 21, 1851 – March 14, 1931) was an American philanthropist and wife of John Munro Longyear, a wealthy businessman. She funded the first King James Version of the Bible in Braille and was a patron of the arts, education and benevolent organizations. A student of Christian Science, in 1911, she began collecting documents and items related to the early development of the religion and later established the Longyear Museum to further this work.

Life 
Born Mary Hawley Beecher in Milwaukee, Wisconsin to Samuel Peck Beecher, a farmer, and Caroline Matilda Beecher (née Walker), she grew up in Bedford Township, Michigan. She was educated at Battle Creek public schools and Albion College, after which she became a teacher.

On January 4, 1879, she married John Munro Longyear in Battle Creek and moved to Marquette, Michigan, where they had seven children, one of whom would later drown in a canoe accident. As her husband's business ventures, particularly in timber and mining, became successful, they became one of the wealthiest couples in Michigan. They built a mansion in Marquette, overlooking Lake Superior, but they also became benefactors of the arts, education, and of efforts to help the blind. From the early 1890s, she was also active in the Christian Science movement, providing financial support to send a Christian Science worker to assist the growing interest in it in Germany.

When Southeastern Railway wanted to lay track through their property, the Longyears decided to move. Knowing that the mansion would be difficult to sell or reproduce, they had the house dismantled and shipped by train 1,300 miles to Brookline, Massachusetts, where it was rebuilt and enlarged. The feat was mentioned in Ripley's Believe It or Not.

In 1919, Mary Beecher Longyear offered J. Robert Atkinson $5,000 a year to create a Braille copy of the King James Version of the Bible. The project took five years.

In 1911, she began collecting objects, letters, and real estate relating to the early history of Christian Science and the life of Mary Baker Eddy, under the belief that these things would be valuable to future generations. In 1923, she established the Longyear Foundation, which later became the Longyear Museum in Brookline, Massachusetts.

Longyear was a member of a number of organizations, including the Women's International League for Peace and Freedom, Daughters of the American Revolution, The Boston Author's Club, Sulgrave Manor Institute in England, and the Marquette County Historical Society, which received a bequest from Longyear's will, enabling them to purchase a building in 1937.

Published works (partial list) 
 Far Countries as Seen by a Boy (1916)
 Gathered Verses of Many Years (1921)
 The Genealogy and Life of Asa Gilbert Eddy (1922)
 Hear, O Israel! (1922)
 The History of a House (1925)

See also 
 Frances Thurber Seal

References

External links 
 
 Mary Hawley Beecher (1851 - 1931) Ancestry.com

Converts to Christian Science
Philanthropists from Massachusetts
Philanthropists from Michigan
1851 births
1931 deaths
Writers from Milwaukee
People from Brookline, Massachusetts
People from Marquette, Michigan
Albion College alumni